Hiwa Abdul Rahman Rashul, nicknamed Triple-X by his American guards, was the first ghost detainee to be publicly acknowledged by American authorities.

Captured by Kurdish forces in Iraq in June or July 2003, he was turned over to the CIA who believed he was a member of Ansar al-Islam. He was then moved to a CIA prison in Afghanistan.

Office of Legal Counsel representative Jack L. Goldsmith informed  Alberto R. Gonzales in October 2003 that Rashul was legally protected under the 4th Geneva Convention, and must legally be returned to Iraq.

On June 16, 2004 Secretary of Defense Donald Rumsfeld acknowledged that he had ordered Rashul to be imprisoned without record, at the request of DCI George Tenet.

Rashul was nicknamed "Triple-X" because, since he was kept off the books, his guards never learned his real name. When some of the circumstance of his incarceration became public, it was suggested that the reason he had been secretly incarcerated for seven months, without being interrogated, was that he got lost. Because of the order to keep him off the books those who would have interrogated him forgot about him, or could not find him. His whereabouts since 2004 are unknown.

References

External links
Transcript of a briefing, from Secretary Rumsfeld, where he answers questions on ghost detainees, June 17, 2004
Rumsfeld Ordered Prisoner Hidden, CBS News, June 17, 2004
Rumsfeld ordered secret detention of Iraqi suspect, The Guardian, June 18, 2004
Iraq's invisible man: A 'ghost' inmate's strange life behind bars, U.S. News & World Report, June 28, 2004
Hiding a bad guy named Triple X: How the military treated some inmates at Abu Ghraib like 'ghosts', U.S. News & World Report, June 28, 2004
Army, CIA Agreed on 'Ghost' Prisoners, Washington Post, March 11, 2005
David Weissbrodt, Amy Bergquist: Extraordinary Rendition: A Human Rights Analysis 

Year of birth missing (living people)
Living people
Iraqi extrajudicial prisoners of the United States